Torri Edwards (born January 31, 1977) is an American sprinter. She competes in 100 and 200 meters, winning an Olympic medal in 4×100-meter relay in 2000. In 2003, she won six medals in major international competitions, including one World Championship gold. Edwards competed in the 100 m at the 2008 Olympic Games.

Early career
Edwards states that she began sprinting when she joined her school team in junior high . Edwards was an average sprinter when she attended Pomona High School, with her best state meet finish ever coming her senior year when she was fourth in the 200m. Edwards would then attend the University of Southern California.

That track season, she won the Pac-10 titles in both the 100 m and 200 m for USC.
She states:

Not until I got to college did I realize that I could be good,...Winning the Pac-10 titles gave me a big boost in confidence, and I found myself setting higher and higher goals.

Doping ban
She was banned for two years effective from July 18, 2004, missing the 2004 Summer Olympics. In August 2004, Edwards appealed the ban, and an arbitration panel acknowledged that Edwards "conducted herself with honesty, integrity and character ... she has not sought to gain any improper advantage or to 'cheat' in any way." In November 2005, her two-year ban was shortened to 15 months when the World Anti-Doping Agency downgraded nikethamide infractions to maximum one-year suspensions. The drug had come from pills she had taken at a meet in Martinique to combat a minor illness. Though arbitrators decided Edwards had taken the drug inadvertently, saying in their ruling that she had conducted herself with "honesty, integrity and character," they did not overturn the suspension, because the glucose tablets given to her by her doctor contained a warning for athletes advising that the pills could cause a positive doping test. Therefore, Edwards did not take performance enhancement drugs to improve her performance.

However, since Edwards was a teammate of Marion Jones in the 2000 Olympic 4×100 meters relay, she was stripped of her medal following Jones's admission to using steroids during the games, though she and 6 other members of the 2000 team would successfully appeal this decision in July 2010.

Personal bests
100 meters - 10.78 (2008)
200 meters - 22.28 (2003

2008 Olympics
At the 2008 Olympic finals for the women's 100 meters, Edwards stated that she thought she had false started and apparently hesitated, believing that the officials were going to call a false start.

Edwards eventually finished eighth place with a time of 11.20, an under-par performance for the American sprinter, who has a best time of 10.78. Edwards states:

I thought I moved before the gun,...I kind of hesitated because I expected to hear a second gun. It threw me off a lot. It's pretty tough.

However, Edwards actually had a reaction time of 0.179 seconds, which was not the fastest or the slowest of the eight runners. It is possible, therefore, that Edwards had not applied enough pressure on the blocks to trigger a false start warning, however she twitched her upper body, but possibly left her feet solid."

Another disappointment came in the 4×100 m relay when the American team dropped the baton in the semi-final due to a misunderstanding between Edwards, on the top bend, and Lauryn Williams on the anchor leg. Williams picked up the baton to finish the race in last place, but the USA was disqualified because she had had to run out of her lane in order to retrieve the baton.

International competitions

Coaching career
Torri Edwards was named head track coach at Kentucky State University in August 2015.

She worked 2 seasons with the UK track and field programs.

Coach Edwards served as an assistant coach in the Riverside Community College track and field program. While serving as an assistant at RCC, Edwards helped the men's track and field team capture conference and state titles in 2012 and 2013.

Edwards most recently worked as a volunteer assistant at Cal Poly Pomona the past two years. She helped Angela Garcia reach the NCAA Division II National Championships in just her first collegiate season of track and field. Garcia also earned All-West Region honors for her work in the 100- and 200-meter events.

See also
List of doping cases in athletics

References

External links

Torri Edwards' U.S. Olympic Team bio
Torri Edwards wins Nike Prefontaine Classic, in Eugene, Oregon

1977 births
Living people
American female sprinters
African-American female track and field athletes
Athletes (track and field) at the 2000 Summer Olympics
Athletes (track and field) at the 2008 Summer Olympics
Pan American Games track and field athletes for the United States
Pan American Games medalists in athletics (track and field)
Athletes (track and field) at the 1999 Pan American Games
Doping cases in athletics
World Athletics Championships athletes for the United States
World Athletics Championships medalists
World Athletics Indoor Championships medalists
American sportspeople in doping cases
Medalists at the 2000 Summer Olympics
Olympic bronze medalists for the United States in track and field
Pan American Games silver medalists for the United States
Track and field athletes from California
Universiade gold medalists for the United States
Universiade medalists in athletics (track and field)
USC Trojans women's track and field athletes
USA Outdoor Track and Field Championships winners
World Athletics Championships winners
Medalists at the 1999 Summer Universiade
Medalists at the 1999 Pan American Games
Olympic female sprinters
21st-century African-American sportspeople
21st-century African-American women
20th-century African-American sportspeople
20th-century African-American women